Wojciech Szymańczyk (19 February 1943 – 22 November 1996) was a Polish archer. He competed in the men's individual event at the 1976 Summer Olympics.

References

1943 births
1996 deaths
Polish male archers
Olympic archers of Poland
Archers at the 1976 Summer Olympics
Sportspeople from Poznań